Xuân Sơn may refer to:

Places in Vietnam
 Xuân Sơn, Bà Rịa–Vũng Tàu, a commune in Châu Đức District, Bà Rịa–Vũng Tàu Province
 Xuân Sơn, a ward of Đông Triều, Quảng Ninh Province
 Xuân Sơn, a commune of Vạn Ninh District, Khánh Hòa Province 
 Xuân Sơn National Park, in Tân Sơn District, Phú Thọ Province, Vietnam

Other uses
Xuan Son virus, isolated in bats in Xuân Sơn National Park